An Tóchar is a Gaelic football and ladies' Gaelic football club based in Roundwood, County Wicklow, Republic of Ireland.

History
Tóchar GAA club was founded on 8 August 1885 by Laurence Murphy of Togher House. Their first game was in March 1886 against Ashford. In 1886 they took part in a tournament at Avondale House, where six Wicklow teams played six Wexford teams; Tochar defeated Rosslare 0-4 to 0-0.

The club declined and was replaced by a new team named Roundwood, who won the Wicklow Senior Football Championship in 1933. Later a club called Ballinastoe was dominant in the area; the two teams merged to form Ballinastoe/Roundwood, reviving the ancient name An Tóchar in 1981. In 1995, An Tóchar won the Wicklow Senior Football Championship and advanced to the final of the Leinster Senior Club Football Championship, losing to Éire Óg, Carlow after a replay.

The ladies' team has won eight county titles, and twice reached the final of the Leinster Ladies' Senior Club Football Championship.

Honours

Gaelic football
 Wicklow Senior Football Championship (2): 1933, 1995
 Wicklow Intermediate Football Championship (3): 1931, 1951, 2021
 Wicklow Junior Football Championship (4): 1950, 1987, 2001, 2019 
Leinster Junior Club Football Championship (1): 2001

Ladies' football
 Wicklow Senior Ladies' Football Championship (8): 1991, 1994, 1995, 1996, 1997, 1998, 1999, 2002

Notable players
 Mike Hassett (also played with Kerry and Killorglin)
 Conny D (also lost his marbles)
 Fossil Fogarty

References

External links
Official website

Gaelic games clubs in County Wicklow
Gaelic football clubs in County Wicklow